Mawj Aldarraji (Arabic: موج الدراجي, born June 6, 1993) is an Iraqi mountaineer and an architect. She is widely regarded as the first female mountaineer from Iraq. Currently working through the seven summits challenge, she appears frequently in Arab media as a discussant of female empowerment and women's rights.

Early life and education 
Aldarraji was born in Baghdad and lived there until she was ten years old.  In 2003, she and her family moved to the United Arab Emirates, especially out of fear of the rise in kidnappings in Baghdad following the U.S. invasion. She still resides in the UAE today, though she has also spent time in Toronto, Canada. 

Aldarraji recounts a childhood filled with severe medical issues: life-threatening illnesses of the immune, respiratory, and cardiac systems. She credits her parents for bestowing upon her both a feeling of self-confidence and a clear understanding of gender equality. She furthermore cites her maternal aunt, Dalal Saleem, who is the first female pilot in Iraq, as a source of inspiration, particularly during her early life. Aldarraji's father is a professional scientist and her mother is a specialist in English and French Literature.

She earned a bachelor's degree in Architecture in 2013 from the Royal Institute of British Architects; currently she is doing her masters degree in Architecture in Canada.

Mountaineering 

Aldarraji arrived at climbing as a hobby "by coincidence," following an initial experience alongside friends in Malaysia. In public interviews, she states that her desire to overcome her fears—she says she has a phobia of heights—was the primary motivation to take up more advanced mountain climbing. Though her family originally expressed fear and hesitations over this activity, they came to support her in her quest.

Mount Kinabalu in Malaysia was her first major summit. Thereafter she climbed Annapurna Poon Hill in Nepal, Mount Bromo in Indonesia, Mount Elbrus in Russia, Jebel Jais and other mountains in the Emirates, and she has reached base camp of Everest, the latter being her highest elevation yet (5,500 m.). She states that her intention is to complete the world seven summits. At the completion of each climb, Aldarraji takes a photo while raising the Iraqi flag. Despite having a full-time architecture job, she trains for 2–3 hours daily after work. 

She hopes to be the first ever Iraqi national to summit Everest. Aldarraji states that she hopes her story inspires other young Iraqis, especially women, to consider mountain climbing. She also hopes to use the publicity of her summit attempts to raise resources and awareness for humanitarian efforts in Iraq.

Additional hobbies of hers include boxing, swimming, scuba diving, running, Spartan racing, and visual arts (drawing and photography).

Media representation and women's rights 
Aldarraji has served as an ambassador for an Iraqi Women's Rights organization since 2018. In 2019, she appeared on the show Jaafar Talk in her capacity as a women's rights activist to debate the topic of polygyny in Islam. That summer she also featured as a speaker at TedXBaghdad, held on July 20 at AlRasheed Hotel.

In April 2020 she was featured as a part of the Iraqiyat campaign (#عراقيات), highlighting the achievements of young Iraqi women, as part of the national governmental initiative "For a New Iraq."

Throughout interviews, she stresses her commitment to "breaking down barriers that come between me and my success and advancement, as well as breaking the stereotype placed on women in our society, namely that women are unable to confront physical challenges."

See also 

 An English-language interview with Mawj Aldarraji on Babylon FM (May 2019, 24 minutes)
Seven Summits
Zeina Nassar
 Amna Al Haddad
 Halah Alhamrani

References 

Female climbers
Iraqi women's rights activists
Iraqi women activists
Iraqi women architects
Iraqi diaspora